Bünyamin Kasal (born 13 January 1997 in Bursa, Turkey) is a Turkish footballer who plays as a left back for Ağrıspor.

Kasal made his professional debut in a 2-5 away win against Mersin İdmanyurdu.

References

External links
 
 
 

1997 births
Living people
People from Acıpayam
Turkish footballers
Bursaspor footballers
Süper Lig players
TFF Second League players
Association football forwards